Julieth Alejandra Rodríguez Quintero (born 20 February 2002) is a Colombian weightlifter. She won the silver medal in the women's 64 kg event at the 2022 Pan American Weightlifting Championships held in Bogotá, Colombia. She won two medals, including gold, at the 2022 Bolivarian Games held in Valledupar, Colombia.

In 2021, she won the gold medal in the women's 64 kg event at the Junior Pan American Games held in Cali and Valle, Colombia. She also won the gold medal in her event at the 2022 Junior World Weightlifting Championships held in Heraklion, Greece.

Achievements

References

External links 
 

Living people
2002 births
Place of birth missing (living people)
Colombian female weightlifters
Pan American Weightlifting Championships medalists
21st-century Colombian women